Pauls Pujats (born 6 August 1991) is a Latvian track and field athlete who competes in the pole vault coached by Tyler Fraizer. He represented his country at the 2016 Summer Olympics and was a finalist. He was a finalist at the 2010 World Junior Championships in Athletics. He competed at the European Athletics Championships in 2012 and 2014.

He was runner-up to Shawn Barber at the 2015 NCAA Division I Outdoor Track and Field Championships. He attended the University of Memphis from 2012 to 2015 and competed for their Memphis Tigers team.

International competitions

References

External links

Living people
Latvian male pole vaulters
Olympic athletes of Latvia
Athletes (track and field) at the 2016 Summer Olympics
Memphis Tigers men's track and field athletes
Latvian expatriates in the United States
1991 births